Otekpa Eneji (born 5 February 1989) is a Nigerian football player currently playing for Kano Pillars F.C. in the Nigeria Premier League.

Career 
He was one of five Pillars players injured during an armed robbery as the club was headings south for their 2015 Nigeria Professional Football League opener against Heartland FC.

International career 
He was selected for the Nigerian national team for the first time in a friendly match against South Korea in August 2010, starting and playing 81 minutes.

References 

1989 births
Living people
Nigerian footballers
Nigeria international footballers
Enyimba F.C. players
BCC Lions F.C. players
People from Gboko
Association football midfielders